The red-flanked bluetail (Tarsiger cyanurus), also known as the orange-flanked bush-robin, is a small passerine bird that was formerly classed as a member of the thrush family Turdidae, but is now more generally considered to be an Old World flycatcher, Muscicapidae. It, and related species, are often called chats.

Habitat
It is a migratory insectivorous species breeding in mixed coniferous forest with undergrowth in northern Asia and northeastern Europe, from Finland east across Siberia to Kamchatka and south to Japan. It winters mainly in southeastern Asia, in the Indian Subcontinent, the Himalayas, Taiwan, and northern Indochina. The breeding range is slowly expanding westwards through Finland (where up to 500 pairs now breed), and it is a rare but increasing vagrant to western Europe, mainly to Great Britain. There have also been a few records in westernmost North America, mostly in western Alaska, but one on San Clemente Island off the southern California coast.

Description
At 13–14 cm long and 10–18 g weight, the red-flanked bluetail is similar in size and weight to the common redstart and slightly smaller (particularly with a slimmer build) than the European robin. As the name implies, both sexes have a blue tail and rump, and orange-red flanks; they also have a white throat and greyish-white underparts, and a small, thin black bill and slender black legs. The adult male additionally has dark blue upperparts, while females and immature males are plain brown above apart from the blue rump and tail, and have a dusky breast. In behaviour, it is similar to a common redstart, frequently flicking its tail in the same manner, and regularly flying from a perch to catch insects in the air or on the ground. The male sings its melancholy trill from treetops. Its call is a typical chat "tacc" noise. The nest is built on or near the ground, with 3–5 eggs which are incubated by the female.

Taxonomy and nomenclature
The genus name Tarsiger is from Ancient Greek tarsos, "flat of the foot" and Latin gerere, "to carry". The specific  cyanurus is also derived from Greek, the roots being kuanos, "dark-blue", and oura, "tail".

In the past generally treated as comprising two subspecies, T. c. cyanurus breeding in northern Asia and T. c. rufilatus breeding in the Himalaya, it is now increasingly being treated as monotypic, with T. c. rufilatus split off as a distinct species, Himalayan bluetail T. rufilatus. The species has also been known by a variety of English and scientific names in the ornithological literature. 

The subspecies albocoeruleus, distributed in north-central China, was described by Wilhelm Meise in 1937. It was usually considered invalid, until recognized by Hadoram Shirihai and Lars Svensson in 2018. And it is now proposed to be a full species, the Qilian bluetail (T. albocoeruleus), in a molecular phylogenetic study published in 2022. It is distinctive in genetics and vocalisation, but only marginally different in morphology. The males of albocoeruleus have bluer fore-supercilium, and less white than in cyanurus.

The table below details the treatments adopted by some major works, by publication date (newest first):

References

red-flanked bluetail
Birds of Russia
red-flanked bluetail